This list of notable Cravath, Swaine & Moore employees catalogs alumni and current employees of the New York City-based law firm in different fields.

Judiciary
Deborah Batts, judge of the United States District Court for the Southern District of New York
Samuel Blatchford,  Associate Justice of the Supreme Court of the United States
William O. Douglas, chairman of the Securities and Exchange Commission, Associate Justice of the Supreme Court of the United States
John T. Elfvin, judge of the U.S. District Court for the Western District of New York nominated by U.S. President Gerald Ford
Katherine B. Forrest, judge of the United States District Court for the Southern District of New York
John Gleeson, judge of the United States District Court for the Southern District of New York
Robert McC. Marsh, member of the New York State Assembly, Justice of the New York Supreme Court
James Clark McReynolds, United States Attorney General; Associate Justice of the United States Supreme Court, nominated by President Woodrow Wilson
Elijah Miller, judge in Auburn, New York; Auburn firm named partner with William H. Seward from 1823
Rowan D. Wilson, judge of the New York Court of Appeals

Government service
Carol Bellamy, Director of the Peace Corps; New York State Senator; President of New York City Council
Richard M. Blatchford, Minister Resident to the States of the Church in Rome, Italy in the administration of President Abraham Lincoln; early Whig Party member
Raynal C. Bolling, U.S. Army Colonel in World War I, first high-ranking officer killed in that war
Richard C. Breeden, activist hedge fund manager and former United States Securities and Exchange Commission Chairman
Valerie E. Caproni, Federal Bureau of Investigation General Counsel
Joseph P. Cotton, Jr., 8th Under Secretary of State in Herbert Hoover's administration
Kenneth W. Dam, Deputy Secretary of Treasury, 2001–2003; Deputy Secretary of State, 1982–1985
Seymour P. Gilbert, Assistant Secretary of the Treasury in Woodrow Wilson and Warren G. Harding's administrations
Roswell Gilpatric, Deputy Secretary of Defense, 1961–1964; Chairman, Task Force on Nuclear Proliferation, 1964
H. Struve Hensel, General Counsel in Departments of Navy and Defense 1941-1955; Assistant Secretary of Defense for International Security Affairs in Eisenhower administration
David Kappos, former Under Secretary of Commerce for Intellectual Property and Director of the U.S. Patent and Trademark Office
Roswell Magill, Treasury Department official
Timothy G. Massad, Chairman of the Commodity Futures Trading Commission; former Assistant Secretary of the Office of Financial Stability
Carlyle E. Maw, Legal Adviser of the Department of State in Richard Nixon's administration
John J. McCloy, former Assistant Secretary of War, former president of the World Bank, former adviser to several U.S. presidents
G. William Miller, Chair of the Federal Reserve 1978-1979; United States Secretary of the Treasury 1979-1981
Christopher Morgan, U.S. Representative from New York
Basil O'Connor, head of the March of Dimes
John Porter, New York State Senator 1843-1846
Howard C. Petersen, Assistant Secretary of War under President Harry S. Truman; Special Assistant for International Trade Policy under President John F. Kennedy
Jennifer Rodgers, former United States Attorney for the Southern District of New York and CNN legal analyst
Richard R. Rogers, Military Governor of Panama Canal Zone under President Theodore Roosevelt
Frederick A.O. Schwarz, Jr., New York City Corporation Counsel
William Seward, former U.S. Senator and Governor of New York, and U.S. Secretary of State under Presidents Abraham Lincoln and Andrew Johnson
Christine A. Varney, former U.S. Assistant Attorney General for the Antitrust Division for the Obama Administration and Federal Trade Commissioner for the Clinton Administration
Dick Zimmer, former Representative for New Jersey's 12th congressional district and 2008 candidate for U.S. Senate

Business
Maxwell Evarts, railroad executive for Southern Pacific et al.
John P. Fishwick, railroad executive for Norfolk & Western
Walker D. Hines, railroad executive and second Director General of the United States Railroad Administration in Wilson administration
Robert A. Kindler, vice chairman of Morgan Stanley
Harvey M. Krueger, CEO of Kuhn, Loeb & Co., vice chairman of Lehman Brothers and Barclays
Russell C. Leffingwell, Chairman of J.P. Morgan & Co.
Adebayo Ogunlesi, chairman and Managing Partner of Global Infrastructure Partners
C. Allen Parker, interim CEO of Wells Fargo
Adam Silver, NBA commissioner
Henry G. Walter Jr., former CEO of International Flavors & Fragrances
Bruce Wasserstein, chairman of Lazard
Devin Wenig, CEO of eBay
Julie Sweet, CEO of Accenture

Legal practice
Thomas D. Barr, litigator who represented IBM in a 13-year antitrust case
David Boies, litigator who represented Al Gore in Bush v. Gore, founding partner of Boies, Schiller & Flexner
Bruce Bromley, famous litigator in the 1950s and 1960s
Evan Chesler, renowned litigator, presiding partner 2007-2013, first chairman of the firm 2013-2021
Paul D. Cravath, corporate lawyer, Cravath firm name partner, presiding partner 1906-1940, pioneer of the Cravath System
Lloyd Cutler, founding partner of Wilmer, Cutler & Pickering
William D. Guthrie, business consolidation and reorganization lawyer, initiated and directed litigation and appeal in Pollock v. Farmers' Loan & Trust Co.
Robert D. Joffe, antitrust and corporate law expert, key figure behind the AOL-Time Warner merger
Victor Morawetz, author of the first book on modern law, The Law of Private Corporations (1882)
Harold Medina, Jr.
John H. Pickering, founding partner of Wilmer, Cutler & Pickering
John B. Quinn, founding partner of Quinn Emanuel Urquhart & Sullivan

Academia
Anita L. Allen, Henry R. Silverman Professor of Law at the University of Pennsylvania Law School, Vice Provost for Faculty and professor of philosophy at the University of Pennsylvania, and member of the Presidential Commission for the Study of Bioethical Issues
Jack Balkin, professor at Yale Law School
Royce de Rohan Barondes, professor at University of Missouri School of Law
Ronald Chen, Dean at Rutgers Law School, former Public Advocate of New Jersey
 Lawrence A. Cunningham, professor at George Washington University Law School, editor of The Essays of Warren Buffett: Lessons for Corporate America
John C. Coffee, professor at Columbia Law School, securities law expert
Gary Francione, animal rights theorist and professor at Rutgers Law School
 John Leitner, the youngest professor in the history of Seoul National University
 Eben Moglen, professor at Columbia Law School, founder, Director-Counsel and Chairman of the Software Freedom Law Center
Charles A. Reich, former Yale Law School professor
Eugene V. Rostow, Dean of Yale Law School; Under Secretary of State for Political Affairs under President Lyndon B. Johnson

Publishing and cinema
Thomas Hauser, author
Carrie Kei Heim, writer, attorney and former child actress
Alan J. Hruska, writer, director, and producer in film, theater, and fiction  
Gerald Posner, journalist
James B. Stewart, journalist and author
George Whipple III, lawyer and society reporter for NY1

References

Cravath, Swaine & Moore
Cravath, Swaine & Moore associates
Cravath, Swaine & Moore partners
Cravath, Swaine & Moore people